Edson Carvalho Vidigal (born June 20, 1944) is a Brazilian politician and lawyer. He served Brazil's Superior Court of Justice from December 9, 1987 to March 29, 2006.

References

External links
Edson Carvalho Vidigal – Superior Court of Justice

1944 births
20th-century Brazilian judges
Democratic Labour Party (Brazil) politicians
Brazilian Socialist Party politicians
Brazilian Democratic Movement politicians
Living people
21st-century Brazilian judges